Bodo Baumgarten (born 25 November 1940) is a German painter, sculptor, graphic artist, and educator. He is a former professor at Hochschule der Bildenden Künste Saar (HBK) in Saarland.

Biography 
Bodo Baumgarten was born on 25 November 1940 in Gdynia, West Prussia (now Poland). He grew up in Schleswig-Holstein and Hamburg in Germany. 

Baumgarten studied painting at the Muthesius Academy of Art (German: Muthesius Kunsthochschule Kiel) from 1962 to 1965; under Hans Domke and Gottfried Brockmann. Baumgarten continued his studies from 1965 to 1969 at the University of Fine Arts of Hamburg, where he started teaching while completing his studies. 

In 1977, Baumgarten participated in documenta 6, a contemporary art exhibition. In 1981, Baumgarten moved to Cologne, Germany, where he maintains his present-day studio. 

He taught painting at the Hochschule der Bildenden Künste Saar (HBK) from 1989 until 2006. Baumgarten had many notable students, including Andrea Neumann.

See also 

 List of German painters

References

External links 
 Profile on HBK website

1940 births
Living people
University of Fine Arts of Hamburg alumni
Academic staff of the Hochschule der Bildenden Künste Saar
People from Gdynia
20th-century German painters
20th-century German male artists
21st-century German painters
21st-century German male artists